Bryan Gallagher (21 September 1911 − 6 October 1982) was an Australian Roman Catholic bishop.

Ordained to the priesthood on 22 December 1934, Gallagher was named bishop of the Roman Catholic Diocese of Port Pirie, Australia. in 1952. He resigned on 11 August 1980.

References 

1911 births
1982 deaths
People from Perth, Western Australia
20th-century Roman Catholic bishops in Australia
Roman Catholic bishops of Port Pirie